The Lombardi Grand Prix is a small, rear-engined sports car on Fiat 850 underpinnings. It was developed by the Carrozzeria Francis Lombardi with an in-house design by Giuseppe Rinaldi. The car was built from 1968 until 1972 and was also marketed as the OTAS 820, as a Giannini, and as the Abarth Grand Prix and Scorpione. It was first shown in March 1968, at the Geneva Motor Show. The design had a Kammback rear and a very low nose with flip-up headlights, and a large single windshield wiper. The pop-up headlights were electrically powered. The bodywork was all steel, except the rear panel. The design was originally shown as a prototype based on the front-wheel drive Autobianchi A112, and was adapted by Lombardi for the 850 sedan's floorpan. At Turin 1969 a targa version was also shown; called the "Monza", this open model has a rollover bar. At least two were built but it is unknown whether any were sold.

Grand Prix
The original Lombardi Grand Prix as presented had the regular 843 cc Fiat 850 engine with  DIN at 5000 rpm (43 hp SAE), coupled to a four-speed gearbox. Luggage space is limited, with very little space next to the spare wheel up front and with a tiny area behind the seats. In case the electric wind-up mechanism for the headlights should fail, there is also a mechanical lever underneath the bonnet. The single round tail lights are Fiat 850 Coupé units. The front suspension consists of a transverse leaf spring on the bottom and A-arms on top, while the rear received coil sprung semi-trailing arms.

The Lombardi Grand Prix was built in two series: early models used the regular, metal engine cover from the Fiat 850 while the Series II has a louvred unit in black metal. The door windows are also different, being of a three-piece design (one on top, two lower pieces of which one could be slid open) while later cars have a more conventional layout with a vent window up front and a single piece which, however, could only be rolled halfway down.

A Cypriot millionaire casino owner had also shown interest in the Lombardi Grand Prix around the time of its introduction. Frixos Demetriou intended to market the car in the United Kingdom and began planning for an order of 1000 cars. After his death in a British Army tank accident in Cyprus, this project came to a sudden halt. Only ten cars were imported into the UK, with the remaining parts languishing in storage in Turin. A few unsold cars were re-exported to Cyprus in 1969 to avoid pending customs bills.

OTAS and Giannini

The tiny OTAS company (Officina Trasformazioni Automobili Sportive, or "Sports car conversion shop") was founded in 1969 and was a collaboration between Francis Lombardi and Franco Giannini - the son of Domenico Giannini of Giannini Automobili - allowing for a more powerful, Giannini-engined Grand Prix model to be marketed abroad. The resulting OTAS Grand Prix has a tuned, 982 cc twin-cam "Tigre" engine. In Italy, this model was sold as the "Giannini 1000 Grand Prix" (beginning in 1969). In a very convoluted operation, Francis Lombardi sold engineless cars to Giannini, while Giannini sold their engines to OTAS for sale outside of Italy.

Responding to interest in the important North American market, OTAS also sold the Grand Prix in the United States and in Canada as the "OTAS Grand Prix 820cc", to give the tiny car its full name. Going on sale in 1970 it was fitted with the same down-sleeved  version of the inline-four engine as used in federalized Fiat 850s to get beneath 50 cubic inches, thereby avoiding the need to carry emissions controls equipment. Sources differ; either sixty-five of these cars were brought to North America or as many as a hundred. Fiat 850 chassis numbers were retained for the OTAS 820. Importer John Rich of Glendale, California, also offered tuneup kits directly and Siata International in New Jersey imported nine of the bigger Tigre-engined cars before the strictures of the EPA put a halt to such activities. This was the first car to have US sales curtailed by the EPA. The OTAS was sold until 1971, when the company shut its doors following homologation troubles. The car never sold particularly well, being expensive considering its performance and with a tendency to overheat.

Abarth models

Along with other tuners (such as Giannini), Carlo Abarth also had a look at the Grand Prix. Abarth's version, first seen at the 1968 Paris Motor Show, received a tuned version of the larger 903 cc engine from the recently introduced Fiat 850 Sport Coupé/Sport Spider. The resulting variant has a claimed , providing performance more suitable to the sporting bodystyle and name. For better cooling than the original Lombardi and OTAS, Abarth mounted the cooler up front, in the air stream.

In 1970 Abarth showed the considerably more powerful "Abarth 1300 Scorpione", what was to be Abarth's last independently developed car. Equipped with a version of the Fiat 124s 1.2 litre engine, bored out by 2.5 mm for a total of 1280 cc, this model has  DIN and only moderately more weight, ranging from  depending on the source. In a 1970 road test by Auto, Motor und Sport, the Scorpione reached , close to the claimed . There is also mention of a 982 cc Abarth 1000 OT-engined version of the Scorpione. The Scorpione had a special Abarth-made bell housing, to allow matching the 124 engine to the four-speed 850 gearbox.

Abarth's Mario Colucci also developed the  Scorpione SS. This powerful model was extensively re-engineered, with a coil-over front suspension, a reworked rear suspension, anti-sway bars front and rear, and all-wheel Girling disc brakes. This model was foreshadowed by the "Scorpione S" of 1969, which had this higher developed chassis combined with the lower powered engine. With the rear-mounted heavier 124 engine weight distribution has a distinct rear bias (39/61), although this seems to have had only a modest effect on handling, limited to some front-end lift at higher speeds. After Abarth was taken over by Fiat in 1971, the Scorpione was quickly cancelled.

References

 

Fiat vehicles
Abarth vehicles
Sports cars
Cars of Italy
1970s cars
Cars introduced in 1968
Rear mid-engine, rear-wheel-drive vehicles